Aneflus paracalvatus is a species of beetle in the family Cerambycidae. It was described by Knull in 1955.

References

Aneflus
Beetles described in 1955